The Bangladesh cricket team toured New Zealand in February and March 2019 to play three Tests and three One Day Internationals (ODIs). The ODI fixtures were part of both teams' preparation for the 2019 Cricket World Cup. The tour ended early, with the cancellation of the third and final Test match, following the Christchurch mosque shootings.

The tour started two day after the conclusion of the 2018–19 Bangladesh Premier League, with Bangladesh's coach Steve Rhodes saying that it is "far from ideal preparation". Conversely, Bangladesh's wicket-keeper batsman Mushfiqur Rahim said it would be ideal preparation ahead of the World Cup, with New Zealand having conditions similar to those in England.

New Zealand won the ODI series 3–0, their fourth-consecutive whitewash in a bilateral ODI series at home against Bangladesh. Ross Taylor became New Zealand's leading run-scorer in One Day International cricket, after he surpassed Stephen Fleming's career total in the third ODI.

Ahead of the tour to New Zealand, Bangladesh's Test captain Shakib Al Hasan suffered a hand injury. Mahmudullah was named as the captain of Bangladesh's team for the first and second Tests. Shakib was eventually ruled out of the third Test. Kane Williamson was ruled out of New Zealand's squad for the third and final Test, with Tim Southee named as captain in his place.

However, the third Test was called off a day before the scheduled start of the match of 15 March 2019, due to the Christchurch mosque shootings. The Bangladesh team were on their way to one of the mosques in Christchurch for Friday prayers, but the team were able to escape to Hagley Oval. The Bangladesh Cricket Board (BCB) later confirmed that the team was safe and back at their hotel. New Zealand had won the first two Test matches to win the series 2–0.

Squads

Ahead of the tour, Taskin Ahmed was ruled out of Bangladesh's squad due to injury. Shafiul Islam and Ebadot Hossain replaced him in Bangladesh's ODI and Test squads respectively. Shakib Al Hasan was ruled out of Bangladesh's ODI squad, after fracturing a finger in the final of the 2018–19 Bangladesh Premier League. Kane Williamson was selected for the first two ODIs in New Zealand's squad, with Colin Munro replacing him in the team for the third ODI, and Tom Latham leading the squad.

After the conclusion of the third ODI, Soumya Sarkar was added to Bangladesh's Test squad as cover for Shakib Al Hasan. Ahead of the third Test, Tom Blundell was added to New Zealand's squad, as cover for BJ Watling. Kane Williamson was ruled out of New Zealand's squad for the third Test, with Will Young added to the squad as his replacement.

Tour matches

50 over match: New Zealand XI vs Bangladesh

Two-day match: New Zealand XI vs Bangladesh

ODI series

1st ODI

2nd ODI

3rd ODI

Test series

1st Test

2nd Test

3rd Test

Notes

References

External links
 Series home at ESPN Cricinfo

2019 in New Zealand cricket
2019 in Bangladeshi cricket
International cricket competitions in 2018–19
Bangladeshi cricket tours of New Zealand